National Women's Soccer League (NWSL) owners own a share in the National Women's Soccer League and have the right to operate a team. Players' rights to play in the league are controlled by a team. Each NWSL team has an investor-operator that is a shareholder in the league. The league has a profit-sharing arrangement amongst the teams.

, the league has 11 investor-operators for its 10 current and one future clubs.

Current NWSL teams

Angel City FC 
Angel City FC was founded in 2020 with investors Kara Nortman, Alexis Ohanian, Natalie Portman, and Julie Uhrman.

Other investors include:

Chicago Red Stars 

Arnim Whisler, Dean Egerter, and Steve Ritchie are considered founding members of the Chicago Red Stars. Whisler has been an owner of the Chicago Red Stars since 2012, while Egerter and Ritchie have been owners since 2021.

Other investors include:

Houston Dash 

The majority owner of the Houston Dash is Ted Segal.

Other investors include Gabriel Brener, Oscar De La Hoya, Jake Silverstein, and Ben Guill.

James Harden joined the ownership group in 2019.

Kansas City Current 
Lead investors of the Kansas City Current are Angie and Chris Long. Other minority investors include Jen Gulvik and Brittany Matthews (2020–present; started play in 2021)

NJ/NY Gotham FC 
The founding investor of NJ/NY Gotham FC is Thomas Hofstetter Since 2012, majority owners have included Tammy Murphy, Phil Murphy, Steven Temares. In 2020, Ed Nalbandian joined as a minority owner. In 2022, Kristin Bernert, Karen Bryant, Carli Lloyd,  Kevin Durant, and Rich Kleiman joined as minority owners.

North Carolina Courage 
Since 2017, Stephen Malik is the owner and chairman of the North Carolina Courage. Naomi Osaka bought a minority interest in 2021.

OL Reign 
 Bill and Teresa Predmore (2012–2019)
 Bill and Teresa Predmore (majority), The Baseball Club of Tacoma LLC, Adrian Hanauer, Lenore Hanauer (minority) (2019–2020)
 OL Groupe (89.5%), Bill and Teresa Predmore (7.5%), Tony Parker (3%) – 2020–present

Orlando Pride 
2015–2018: Flávio Augusto da Silva (majority) and Phil Rawlins (minority) 
2018–2021: Flávio Augusto da Silva (majority), Phil Rawlins (minority), Albert Friedberg (minority)
Since 2021: The Wilf Family (Mark Wilf, Zygi Wilf, Lenny Wilf)

Portland Thorns FC 
Merritt Paulson (2012–present)

Racing Louisville FC 
 Soccer Holdings, LLC (2019–present; started play in 2021)

San Diego Wave FC 
 Majority Owner:  Ronald Burkle

Washington Spirit 
 Bill Lynch (2012–2018)
 Steve Baldwin (majority) and Bill Lynch (minority) (2018–2022), with other minority investors including Jenna Bush Hager, Chelsea Clinton, Dominique Dawes, and Alexander Ovechkin
 Majority Owner:  Michele Kang (2022–present)

Former NWSL teams

Boston Breakers 
 Michael Stoller, Boston Women's Soccer, LLC (2012–2018)

FC Kansas City 
 Chris Likens, Brad Likens, Greg Likens, and Brian Budzinski (Missouri Comets owners) (2012–2017)
 Elam Baer (2017)

Utah Royals FC 
Dell Loy Hansen (2017–2020)

Western New York Flash 
 Joe Sahlen (2013–2017)

See also
 List of professional sports team owners

References